War Orphans is an album by the Swedish pianist Bobo Stenson, recorded in 1997 and released on the ECM label.

Reception
The AllMusic review by Thom Jurek stated: "While the last Bobo Stenson Trio offering found the band cohesively searching for a new harmonic language together and separately as composers, on War Orphans they seem to have found it".

Track listing
All compositions by Anders Jormin except as indicated
 "Oleo de Mujer Con Sombrero" (Silvio Rodríguez) - 8:32 
 "Natt" - 8:10 
 "All My Life" (Ornette Coleman) - 6:25 
 "Eleventh of January" - 5:58 
 "War Orphans" (Coleman) - 6:17 
 "Sediment" (Jormin) 5:22 
 "Bengali Blue" (Bobo Stenson) 8:18 
 "Melancholia" (Duke Ellington) - 5:28 
Recorded at the Rainbow Studio in Oslo, Norway in May 1997

Personnel
Bobo Stenson — piano
Anders Jormin — bass
Jon Christensen — drums

References

See also
Robinson Crusoes of Warsaw
Wolf children

ECM Records albums
Bobo Stenson albums
1998 albums
Albums produced by Manfred Eicher